The Iceland women's national handball team is the national handball team of Iceland and takes part in international team handball competitions. They qualified to the 2010 European Women's Handball Championship. This was the first time they qualified to any international championship. They finished with the 15th place. Two years later, at the 2012 European Women's Handball Championship, they managed the same results.

Second time they qualified to international championship were when they qualified to the 2011 World Women's Handball Championship.

Results

World Championship
2011 – 12th place

European Championship
2010 – 15th place
2012 – 15th place

Squad
The squad chosen for the two qualification matches for the 2022 European Women's Handball Championship, against Turkey in March 2022.

Caps and goals as of 17 March 2022, after the matches against Turkey.

Head coach: Arnar Pétursson

Extended squad
The following players have been called up to the Icelandic squad within the last 12 months.

Coaching staff

Famous players
 Rakel Dögg Bragadóttir
 Hrafnhildur Skúladóttir
 Hanna Guðrún Stefánsdóttir
 Anna Úrsúla Guðmundsdóttir
 Karen Knútsdóttir
 Rut Arnfjörð Jónsdóttir
 Arna Sif Pálsdóttir
 Þórey Rósa Stefánsdóttir
 Dagný Skúladóttir
 Anna Úrsúla Guðmundsdóttir
 Stella Sigurðardóttir

References

External links

IHF profile

National team
Women's national handball teams
Women's national sports teams of Iceland